Judith Miriam Oakes (born 14 February 1958 in Lewisham, Greater London) is a female retired English shot putter, powerlifter, and weightlifter.

Athletics career
Oakes represented Great Britain in the 1984 Summer Olympics, 1988 Summer Olympics, 1996 Summer Olympics and 2000 Summer Olympics.

Oakes competed in six consecutive Commonwealth Games from 1978 until 1998 and won a medal at every one of them. She represented England and won a bronze medal at the 1978 Commonwealth Games in Edmonton, Alberta, Canada. Four years later she represented England and won a gold medal, at the 1982 Commonwealth Games in Brisbane, Queensland, Australia. A further four years later she represented England and won a silver medal, at the 1986 Commonwealth Games in Edinburgh, Scotland. The fourth appearance and medal came in 1990 when she represented England and won another silver, at the 1990 Commonwealth Games in Auckland, New Zealand. The fifth and sixth medals were a both gold medals at the 1994 Commonwealth Games in Victoria and the 1998 Commonwealth Games in Kuala Lumpur.

Her personal best put was 19.36 metres, achieved in August 1988 in Gateshead. This is still the British record.

Powerlifting career
She was World Champion in Powerlifting three times, and European Champion eight times. Her last British Record (a Squat of 202½kg in the 75 kg bodyweight class set in February 1989) lasted until June 2008, when Marie Thornton squatted 215 kg.

Awards
She was given an OBE (Officer of the Order of the British Empire) in 1999.

Achievements in athletics

References

1958 births
Living people
British female shot putters
English female shot putters
British powerlifters
Female powerlifters
Officers of the Order of the British Empire
Olympic athletes of Great Britain
Athletes from London
Athletes (track and field) at the 1978 Commonwealth Games
Athletes (track and field) at the 1982 Commonwealth Games
Athletes (track and field) at the 1984 Summer Olympics
Athletes (track and field) at the 1988 Summer Olympics
Athletes (track and field) at the 1990 Commonwealth Games
Athletes (track and field) at the 1994 Commonwealth Games
Athletes (track and field) at the 1996 Summer Olympics
Athletes (track and field) at the 1998 Commonwealth Games
Athletes (track and field) at the 2000 Summer Olympics
Commonwealth Games medallists in athletics
Commonwealth Games gold medallists for England
Commonwealth Games silver medallists for England
Commonwealth Games bronze medallists for England
Athletes (track and field) at the 1986 Commonwealth Games
Competitors at the 1998 Goodwill Games
Medallists at the 1978 Commonwealth Games
Medallists at the 1982 Commonwealth Games
Medallists at the 1986 Commonwealth Games
Medallists at the 1990 Commonwealth Games
Medallists at the 1994 Commonwealth Games
Medallists at the 1998 Commonwealth Games